Network 26 is a network of 26 bus routes on Hong Kong Island, which were previously operated by China Motor Bus (CMB) before being annexed to Citybus by the Government of Hong Kong on 1 September 1993.

Background
After CMB's heyday in the 1960s and 70s, its service quality started to deteriorate in the 1980s, with service delays and aging vehicles.

On 30 November 1989, CMB staff went on a strike due to problems on retirement pay. CMB services were completely suspended, and traffic on Hong Kong Island ran into chaos. The most severe situation occurred in Southern District, which had no MTR service, to an extent that even police vehicles were mobilized to provide transport services. Citybus operated temporary routes to deal with the situation. The Government decided to rearrange bus services on the Island.

Citybus had set its sights on services 12A and 17 that CMB has already withdrawn. It considers that residents residing in MacDonald Road, are richer and needed high-quality bus services. Upon obtaining the consent from the government, Citybus has announced in September 1989 that it intends to re-operate. In terms of that, after the strike, Citybus will formally apply to the government.

In 1990, Citybus applied to start three non-franchised routes, namely 37R, 90R and 97R, all serving between Southern District to Admiralty. In March the same year, Citybus applied to operate the route 12A which CMB had previously requested to be cancelled due to low patronage. The application was approved, and services by Citybus commenced in September 1991 with air-conditioned Leyland Olympian double deckers. Other bids such as Argos Bus, Coornet Bus and Hong Kong Buses bid for the tender, together with Kowloon Motor Bus, eventually changing the mind and waive off the bidding.

Later, seeing no improvement in CMB's services, the Government decided to re-tender 26 of CMB's routes to another company. Two companies applied, namely Citybus and Stagecoach. Since Stagecoach had no experience on operating routes in Hong Kong, Citybus won the tender. The routes were operated by Citybus in effective from 1 September 1993.

Routes
The routes included numbers 1, 1M, 5, 5A, 5B, 6, 6A, 10X, 12, 12M, 48, 61, 61M, 70, 70M, 72, 72A, 72B, 75, 76, 90, 92, 96, 97, 97A, 98, 107 and 170.

Aftermath

Further route annexations
Significant service improvements were observed on the annexed routes, while CMB's service quality remained unsatisfactory. On 1 September 1995, the Government annexed a further 14 routes to Citybus, namely routes 7, 11, 37, 40, 40M, 71, 73, 85, 99, 511, 592, 260, 103 and 182.

In 1997, CMB gave up four routes which were taken over by Citybus immediately: 45 and 47 became 40P and 47A on 3 March, 41 became 41A on 21 April 1997, and 3 became 3B on 2 June 1997.

The demise of CMB
Even with the previous route annexations, CMB still declined to improve its services. When the Government decided to implement the Octopus card system in 1997 for public transport, CMB rejected to follow. Furthermore, it failed to deliver proposals that year for franchise renewal due in 1998. On 17 February 1998, the Executive Council discontinued CMB's franchise, which would expire on 31 August 1998. 12 routes were directly handed over to Citybus, and one to Kowloon Motor Bus (KMB). 11 routes were scheduled for cancellation with the franchise expiry. The remaining 88 routes were opened up for tender. CMB, KMB and Citybus joined in the tender; however it happened to be New World First Bus (NWFB), a completely new bus operator in Hong Kong formed by a joint venture between New World Development and FirstGroup, which won the tender in the end. At midnight on 1 September 1998, CMB ceased to operate bus services with the expiry of its tender, and the routes were taken over by NWFB.

The cancelled routes include: 10A, 11A, 15M, 15X, 38A, 79, 337, 392, 504, A20 and N38A.

References

Bus transport in Hong Kong